The 1923 German Ice Hockey Championship was the seventh season of the German Ice Hockey Championship, the national championship of Germany. Berliner Schlittschuhclub won the championship by defeating SC Charlottenburg in the final.

Final

References

External links
German ice hockey standings 1912-1932
Ger
German Ice Hockey Championship seasons
1922–23 in German ice hockey